Fort Frederick in Port Elizabeth, South Africa, was built in 1799 in order to stop the French from conquering the Cape Colony during the Napoleonic wars and played a vital role in establishing British rule in South Africa in combination with the Battle of Blaauwberg.

History
Overlooking the strategic Algoa Bay, Fort Frederick was built in 1799 on a natural vantage point. Named after Frederick, Duke of York and Albany, commander-in-chief of the British Army, it was built by troops sent to Algoa Bay to prevent a possible landing of French troops, under Napoleon to assist the Graaff-Reinet rebels during the Napoleonic wars, this event is often regarded to be the beginning of the British rule in the Cape Colony.

The "landing with fresh water", as Algoa Bay was referred to, sits at the mouth of the Baakens River, the bay stretches from the Baakens River to the outskirts of modern-day Port Elizabeth. When the 1820 Settlers arrived in Port Elizabeth, the fort was already ancient and had never fired a shot from its guns and still has not.

The fort contains several key design features namely: the powder magazine, the blockhouse (which has lost its timber upper storey) and its original armaments consisted of two 8-pounder guns and one 5.5 inch Howitzer and the museum collection now also contains a varied selection of muzzle-loaders dating from the later part of the eighteenth century.

Captain Francis Evatt, Commandant of Fort Frederick between 1817 and 1847 is buried on the Donkin Reserve which Fort Frederick forms a part of. Captain Evatt played an important role in overseeing the arrivals of the Settlers in 1820.

Port Elizabeth sprang up around the fort.

Tourism
Opening times are daily, from sunrise to sunset and the admission is free.
The fort is reportedly haunted by the ghosts of a Shakespeare play.

Gallery

See also

List of Castles and Fortifications in South Africa
Port Elizabeth
Cape colony
Battle of Blaauwberg
Invasion of the Cape Colony (1795)
British rule in South Africa

References

Castles in South Africa
Frederick
1799 establishments in the British Empire
Buildings and structures in Port Elizabeth
Reportedly haunted locations in South Africa